The Joan Edwards Show was an American television variety show broadcast on the now-defunct DuMont Television Network.

Broadcast History
The 15-minute show was hosted by Joan Edwards (1919-1981), premiered July 4, 1950, and ended October 24, 1950.The Joan Edwards Show aired Tuesdays and Thursdays at 7:45PM ET, alternating with The Hazel Scott Show which premiered on July 3, 1950 and was in the same time slot on Mondays, Wednesdays, and Fridays. (Beginning on October 2, 1950, The Susan Raye Show was a replacement for The Hazel Scott Show after Scott was accused of being a Communist in the newsletter Red Channels.)

Episode status
As with most DuMont series, no episodes are known to exist.

See also
List of programs broadcast by the DuMont Television Network
List of surviving DuMont Television Network broadcasts
1950-51 United States network television schedule

References

Bibliography
David Weinstein, The Forgotten Network: DuMont and the Birth of American Television (Philadelphia: Temple University Press, 2004) 
Alex McNeil, Total Television, Fourth edition (New York: Penguin Books, 1980) 
Tim Brooks and Earle Marsh, The Complete Directory to Prime Time Network TV Shows, Third edition (New York: Ballantine Books, 1964)

External links
 
 DuMont historical website

DuMont Television Network original programming
1950 American television series debuts
1950 American television series endings
Black-and-white American television shows
English-language television shows
Lost television shows
1950s American music television series